Scombroclupea is an extinct genus of prehistoric bony fish that lived during the Cenomanian.

References

Clupeiformes
Late Cretaceous fish
Extinct animals of Europe